Zabiba (also transliterated Zabibah, Zabibeh, Zabibe) is an Arabic word  derived from the word zabīb, meaning "raisin". It may refer to:

Zabibe, an 8th-century queen who was a vassal of the Assyrian empire
Prayer bump, a mark that appears on the forehead of those who engage in regular Muslim prayer
The namesake character of Saddam Hussein's romance novel Zabibah and the King

See also
 Zebibah